The lateral palpebral arteries are the two large branches of those terminal branches of the lacrimal gland that supply the eyelid, with one lateral palpebral artery supplying one eyelid or the other. They pass medial-ward within the eyelid. They anastomose with medial palpebral arteries to form an arterial cricle.

See also 

 Medial palpebral arteries

References 

Arteries of the head and neck